Brían O'Rourke (1949-2022) was a composer and singer of Irish folk songs. He lectured in Irish Studies at Galway-Mayo Institute of Technology and authored several books on Irish folk songs.

Life 
O'Rourke was born in Ratheniska, County Laois. He was married and had three children, with whom he lived in Magherabaun, Feakle. O'Rourke taught Irish Studies or Irish Heritage at Galway-Mayo Institute of Technology.

Works 
O'Rourke published two volumes with collections of Irish songs. These songs were frequently performed by Sean nós singers.

 Blas Meala (english: A sip from the honeypot)
 An Dhub ina Bhan (english: Pale rainbow)

As a composer, he was best known for "The Bhodrán song" (when I grow up), included on the album The Very Best of Irish Ballads (ARC Music 2015) and Chantal du Champignon.

In the book chapter "County Mayo in Gaelic Folk Song", O´Rourke identifies a series of characters in the history of County Mayo that are remembered through folk songs. 

 Seán Mac Aoidh, murder suspect and ascribed author of the poem Sail Og Rua
 Dónal Ó Maoláine, rapparee described in an adventure song
 Lacky Ó Máille, the troubled friar and author of two songs
 Tomás Bán Mac Aodhagáin, a person sentenced to be hanged who is described in the song that bears his name
 Dónal Meirgeach Mac Conmara, the freckled adscribed author of the song An Ghaoth Andeas

References 

1949 births
2022 deaths
Irish composers